Stigmella triumfettica is a moth of the family Nepticulidae. It was described by Scoble in 1978. It is found in South Africa (it was described from the Pretoria District in Transvaal).

The larvae feed on Triumfetta species. They probably mine the leaves of their host plant.

References

Endemic moths of South Africa
Nepticulidae
Moths of Africa
Moths described in 1978